William Harvey Murray (September 2, 1916 – July 7, 1991) was a political figure in British Columbia, Canada. He represented Prince Rupert in the Legislative Assembly of British Columbia from 1956 to 1972 as a Social Credit member.

He was born in Wallyford, a community on the outskirts of Edinburgh, Scotland, the son of Robert Kirkwood Murray and Agnes Gordon Harvey. Murray was a clerk with the British Columbia Forest Service, owned and managed the Crest Hotel in Prince Rupert and also worked as an accountant. He served in the Royal Canadian Navy during World War II. In 1946, he married Gwyneth Margaret Walker. He ran unsuccessfully for a seat in the British Columbia assembly in 1953. Murray was speaker for the British Columbia assembly from 1964 to 1972. He was defeated by Graham Lea when he ran for reelection in 1972.

He died in 1991 of lung cancer.

References 

1916 births
1991 deaths
Scottish emigrants to Canada
Speakers of the Legislative Assembly of British Columbia
British Columbia Social Credit Party MLAs